Hearne v. Stowell was an 1841 court case held in the Nisi Prius Court, Liverpool Assizes pertaining to a case of libel in Manchester, England. The case is a prominent case of an inter-clergy lawsuit and is cited both as an example of anti-Catholic sentiment in the United Kingdom in the mid 19th century  and as a sample of libel precedent. Hugh Stowell, an Anglican preacher, alleged that Daniel Hearne, a Catholic priest, had forced a man to crawl down a street for penance. Hearne sued for libel and while the court case was resolved in his favour, it was later reversed by the Queen's Bench.

References 

English defamation case law
1841 in case law
1841 in England
1841 in British law
Court of King's Bench (England) cases
English law articles needing infoboxes